Nemanja Nikolić may refer to:
 Nemanja Nikolić (footballer, born 1987), Serbian-Hungarian footballer
 Nemanja Nikolić (footballer, born 1988), Montenegrin footballer
 Nemanja Nikolić (footballer, born 1992), Serbian footballer
 Nemanja Nikolić (footballer, born 2001), Bosnian footballer